Year Zero Remixed (stylized as Y34RZ3R0R3M1X3D) is the third remix album by American industrial rock band Nine Inch Nails, released in the United States on November 20, 2007, and in the United Kingdom six days later. It features remixed versions of tracks from the band's previous studio album Year Zero, created by various producers and recording artists.

This album was the last Nine Inch Nails album to be released by Interscope Records; it fulfilled the band's contractual commitments to the company, leaving Nine Inch Nails frontman Trent Reznor to proceed as a "totally free agent, free of any recording contract with any label".

Versions
The album was released in three formats: digital download, CD/DVD-ROM combo, and triple vinyl. The digital download and CD releases feature the same track listing. The iTunes version lists the album title as Y34RZ3R0R3MIX3D, using the letter "I" in place of the numeral "1" when compared to the album's cover art. The bonus DVD-ROM included with the CD release contains multi-track files from the entire Year Zero album in GarageBand and Ableton Live formats, as well as a demo version of the Ableton Live software, and 44100 Hz WAV-format files of the album's individual track portions, for use in any non-linear music editing software such as Cakewalk Sonar or Pro Tools.

Five songs are exclusive to the vinyl pressing, including the Switch remix of "Capital G", which was previously released on the "Capital G" single; and two different mixes of "Vessel". The LP was pressed on triple 180 Gram virgin vinyl at Nashville's historic United Record Pressing and features a triple gatefold jacket. The Saul Williams remix of "Survivalism" (previously featured on some editions of the "Survivalism" single) and the shortest of Bill Laswell's three remixes of "Vessel" are not included on the vinyl. The Ladytron remix of "The Beginning of the End" on the album incorporates the outro motif from the 1994 Nine Inch Nails song "Closer".

Critical reception

Year Zero Remixed received generally positive reviews. Virgin Media's review described the album as "a real cornucopia of treats" and "[h]ighly recommended". Pitchfork's review, however, criticized the album, writing that it "lacks cohesion and is predictably spotty". The Toronto Star stated, "Year Zero Remixed enlists a commendably eclectic assortment of artists. The results are an intriguingly cerebral hodgepodge." It also stated that the largest selling point was the bonus DVD-ROM disc. The Denver Post mused that "perhaps it's the best remix outing of Reznor's career".

Track listing

CD/DVD and digital download

Vinyl
(Note: One of the discs is single-sided.)

Charts

Weekly charts

Year-end charts

References

External links
 Official Year Zero page at NIN.com
 
 

2007 remix albums
Interscope Records remix albums
Nine Inch Nails remix albums